Belinda Bozzoli (17 December 19455 December 2020) was a South African author, academic, sociologist, and politician. She was deputy vice-chancellor of the University of the Witwatersrand for a period from 2002, having headed its school of social sciences.  In 2014 Bozzoli was elected a member of the South African parliament for the Democratic Alliance.  From 2019 she served as Shadow Minister of Higher Education, Science and Technology.

Early life and education
Bozzoli was born on 17 December 1945 in Johannesburg to Guerino Renzo and Cora Bertha Bozzoli, both Italian South Africans. She earned her Bachelor of Arts and Honours degrees from the University of the Witwatersrand and then obtained her Master of Arts and Doctor of Philosophy at the University of Sussex. Bozzoli was an Associate Fellow at Yale University between 1978 and 1979.

Academic career
Bozzoli authored three single-authored, internationally published books and was the editor or co-editor of a further four. She had, in total, published 26 articles.

Bozzoli became head of sociology at the University of the Witwatersrand in the late 1990s and was head of the School of Social Sciences from 2001 to 2003. She became Deputy Vice-Chancellor in 2002 and chaired the Board of the National Research Foundation for a time. She was awarded an A-rating from the National Research Foundation in 2006. Bozzoli was the first sociologist to be honoured in this way. Bozzoli also served as the acting director of the Wits Institute for Social and Economic Research.

Political career
In 2014, Bozzoli stood for election to the South African National Assembly as 77th on the Democratic Alliance's (DA) national list. At the election, Bozzoli won a seat in the National Assembly. Upon election, she became the Shadow Minister of Higher Education and Training. She was a member of the Portfolio Committee on Higher Education and Training and the DA's contact for Boksburg West constituency during the 2014–19 parliament.  In October 2016 she criticised the African National Congress Party's universities policy which she said had seen government funding fall from 50% to 40% of university income since 1994 and led to budget shortfalls, larger class sizes and increased fees.

Bozzoli was re-elected to Parliament in 2019. Bozzoli was then made Shadow Minister for the newly created Higher Education, Science and Technology portfolio.  In June 2020 she raised concerns over the South African government's move to write off 1.96 billion rand of student debt. Bozzoli stated that the DA had no objection to the debts of low-income students being forgiven, but queried whether the move would benefit high-earning students who were simply unwilling to pay back loans.  She was also concerned about the impact on funding for universities.

Death
Bozzoli died of cancer on 5 December 2020, twelve days before her 75th birthday. She was survived by her husband, Charles van Onselen, and their three children.  She had continued to work in politics during her final illness.

References

1945 births
2020 deaths
Deaths from cancer in South Africa
University of the Witwatersrand alumni
Alumni of the University of Sussex
Yale University faculty
Democratic Alliance (South Africa) politicians
Women members of the National Assembly of South Africa
Members of the National Assembly of South Africa
21st-century South African politicians
21st-century South African writers
Place of death missing
Academic staff of the University of the Witwatersrand
21st-century South African women politicians
21st-century South African women writers
South African people of Italian descent